K3b (from KDE Burn Baby Burn) is a CD, DVD and Blu-ray authoring application by KDE for Unix-like computer operating systems. It provides a graphical user interface to perform most CD/DVD burning tasks like creating an Audio CD from a set of audio files or copying a CD/DVD, as well as more advanced tasks such as burning eMoviX CD/DVDs. It can also perform direct disc-to-disc copies. The program has many default settings which can be customized by more experienced users. The actual disc recording in K3b is done by the command line utilities cdrecord or cdrkit, cdrdao, and growisofs. As of version 1.0, K3b features a built-in DVD ripper.

As is the case with most KDE applications, K3b is written in the C++ programming language and uses the Qt GUI toolkit. Released under the GNU General Public License, K3b is free software.

A first alpha of a KDE Platform 4 version of K3b was released on 22 April 2009, the second on 27 May 2009 and a third on 14 October 2009.

K3b is a software project that was started in 1998, and is one of the mainstays of the KDE desktop.

Features 
Some of K3b's main features include:
 Data CD/DVD burning;
 Audio CD burning;
 CD-Text support;
 Blu-ray/DVD-R/DVD+R/DVD-RW/DVD+RW support;
 CD-R/CD-RW support;
 Mixed Mode CD (CD-DA and -ROM on one disc);
 Multisession CD;
 Video CD/Video DVD authoring;
 eMovix CD/eMovix DVD;
 Disk-to-disk CD and DVD copying;
 Erasing Rewritable discs;
 ISO image support;
 Ripping Audio CDs, Video CDs, Video DVDs.

K3b can also burn data CDs that support Linux/Unix based OS, Windows, DOS, Very Large Files (UDF), Linux/Unix + Windows, Rock Ridge, and Joliet file systems.

K3b's full list of features (the below list could be still incomplete):
 Creating data CDs:
 Add files and folders to data CD project via drag and drop;
 Remove files from your project, move files within your project;
 Create empty directories within your project;
 Write data CDs on-the-fly directly without an image file or with image file. It's also possible to just create the image file and write it to CD later;
 Rockridge and Joliet file system support;
 Rename files within the project;
 Let K3b rename all the mp3/ogg files you add to your project to a common format like "artist - title.mp3;
 For advanced users: support for nearly all the mkisofs options;
 Verifying the burned data;
 Support for multiple El-Torito boot images;
 Multisession support.
 Creating audio CDs:
 Pluggable audio decoding. Plugins for WAV, mp3, FLAC, and Ogg Vorbis are included;
 CD-Text support. Will automagically be filled in from tags in audio files;
 Write audio CDs on-the-fly, without decoding audio files to wav before;
 Normalize volume levels before writing;
 Cut audio tracks at the beginning and the end.
 Creating Video CDs:
 VCD 1.1, 2.0, SVCD;
 CD-i support (Version 4).
 Creating mixed-mode CDs:
 CD-Extra (CD-Plus, Enhanced Audio CD) support;
 All data and audio project features.
 Creating eMovix CDs.
 CD Copying:
 Copy single and multi session data CDs;
 Copy Audio CDs;
 Copy Enhanced Audio CDs (CD-Extra);
 Copy CD-Text;
 Add CD-Text from CDDB;
 CD Cloning mode for perfect single session CD copies.
 DVD Burning:
 Support for DVD-R(W) and DVD+R(W);
 Creating data DVD projects;
 Creating eMovix DVDs;
 Formatting DVD-RWs and DVD+RWs.
 CD Ripping:
 CDDB support via http, cddbp and local cddb directory;
 Sophisticated pattern system to automatically organize the ripped tracks in directories and name them according to album, title, artist, and track number;
 CD-Text reading. May be used instead of CDDB info;
 K3b stores CDDB info of the ripped tracks which will automatically be used as CD-Text when adding the ripped files to an audio project;
 Plugin system to allow encoding to virtually every audio format. Plugins to encode to Ogg Vorbis, mp3, FLAC, and all formats supported by SoX included.
 DVD Ripping and DivX/XviD encoding.
 Save/load projects.
 Blanking of CD-RWs.
 Retrieving Table of contents and cdr information.
 Writing existing iso images to CD or DVD with optional verification of the written data.
 Writing cue/bin files created for CDRWIN.
 DVD copy (no video transcoding yet).
 Enhanced CD device handling:
 Detection of maximal writing and reading speed.
 Detection of Burnfree and Justlink support.
 Good media detection and optional automatic CD-RW and DVD-RW blanking.
 KParts-Plugin ready.

See also 

 List of optical disc authoring software
 Brasero, a GTK+ optical disc authoring program.

References

External links
 K3b website
 Bug tracker

Extragear
Free optical disc authoring software
Free software programmed in C++
KDE Applications
Linux CD ripping software
Linux CD/DVD writing software
Optical disc authoring software
Optical disc-related software that uses Qt